, also known under the name , is a Japanese voice actress from Tokyo, Japan, and is employed by Aoni Production.

Voices roles

Anime
A-kuei
Beyblade
Deltora Quest (Filli)
Demashita! Powerpuff Girls Z (Shirogane Himeko)
Figure 17
Gegege no Kitaro
Hamtaro
Kamichama Karin
Kirarin Revolution
Mirmo!
Mistin
Ojamajo Doremi
One Piece
Pocket Monsters (Jigglypuff)
Tweeny Witches (Mileth)
Yakitate!! Japan

Games
Miko Miko Nurse
Minna de Kitaeru Zenno Training
Mirmo!
One: Kagayaku Kisetsu e
Ratchet & Clank
Rune Factory Frontier (Rita)
Valkyria Chronicles

Dubbing
Clifford the Big Red Dog (Emily Elizabeth)
Freak House (Sutina Digest)

References
Chigusa Ikeda at the Voice Artist DataBase

External links
Chigusa Ikeda at Aoni Production's website 

1976 births
Japanese voice actresses
Living people
People from Tokyo
20th-century Japanese actresses
21st-century Japanese actresses
Aoni Production voice actors
Ferris University alumni